Job van de Walle (born 26 May 1997) is a Dutch professional footballer who plays for as a goalkeeper, for Groene Ster, on loan from Fortuna Sittard.

Career
Born in Heerlen, Van de Walle has played for Fortuna Sittard and Groene Ster

References

1997 births
Living people
Dutch footballers
Fortuna Sittard players
RKSV Groene Ster players
Eerste Divisie players
Association football goalkeepers
Sportspeople from Heerlen
Footballers from Limburg (Netherlands)